Krzysztof Filipek (born 1 August 1961) is a Polish politician.

Background and career 
Filipek was born in Węgrów.  He was elected to the Sejm on 25 September 2005, getting 16,515 votes in 18 Siedlce district as a candidate from the Self-Defence of the Republic of Poland list.

He was also a member of Sejm 2001-2005.

In 2007 Self-Defence lost the parliamentary election and Filipek left this party. Now he is a member and leader of the Party of Regions.

Trivia
Before being elected to the Sejm, he was working as a janitor.

See also
Members of Polish Sejm 2005-2007

External links
Krzysztof Filipek - parliamentary page - includes declarations of interest, voting record, and transcripts of speeches.

1961 births
Living people
People from Węgrów County
Members of the Polish Sejm 2005–2007
Members of the Polish Sejm 2001–2005
Self-Defence of the Republic of Poland politicians
Self-Defence of the Republic of Poland MEPs
MEPs for Poland 2004